Stereospermum tetragonum, the yellow snake tree,  is 15–20 m tall, trunk 15–25 cm in diam, large leaves 25–50 cm; leaflets 3–6 on each side of midrib, long elliptic, 8-14 X 2.5–6 cm. Large, pale yellow, trumpet shaped flowers occur in panicles. Flowers are pale yellow, slightly curved, about 2 cm, upper lip 2-lobed, lower lip 3-lobed, tomentose at mouth, tube terete. The fruit is long, 4-angular, slightly curved, 30–70 cm, about 1 cm in diameter. This, probably, is the source of its common name, snake tree.

Also known as Stereospermum colais, it is found in India, Myanmar and Sri Lanka: where it is "common in moist deciduous forests and occasional in openings or margins of evergreen forests, up to 1200 m."

Its young leaves can be eaten as a vegetable in Vietnam's Central Highlands.

References

tetragonum